"The Stranded" is the 27th episode of the sitcom Seinfeld. It is the tenth episode of the show's third season. It first aired on November 27, 1991. The episode was originally produced for Season 2 but was postponed because Larry David was dissatisfied with the episode; it was therefore advertised as a "lost" episode. It was also released in the first and second season set instead of the third.

The episode was written by Larry David, Jerry Seinfeld and Matt Goldman and was directed by Tom Cherones. Besides the usual cast, other actors in the episode include: Michael Chiklis, Teri Austin, Bobbi Jo Lathan, Gwen Shepherd, and Marcia Firesten.

Plot
At a drug store, George has an altercation with the cashier, accusing her of short-changing him ten dollars. He is removed by the security guard.

George is invited to a party on Long Island and brings Elaine and Jerry with him. Jerry and Elaine become trapped in boring conversations. When Ava, a co-worker, comes on to George, Jerry gives him permission to leave with her in his car, even though this strands Jerry and Elaine at the party. As they leave, Elaine confronts Ava because of the morality of her fur coat.

They call Kramer and ask him to pick them up, but he forgets the order of digits in the house number, leaving him no recourse but to try every permutation. He arrives at 2am, long after all the other guests are gone. As a sign of gratitude for allowing him and Elaine to wait at their home, Jerry suggests the hosts, Steve and Jenny, stop by his apartment if they are ever in Manhattan.

A week later, Steve takes him up on his offer just as Jerry is heading out the door. Jerry allows him to wait in the apartment until his return. Kramer stops by and he and Steve get drunk and bond. Eventually Steve hires a prostitute to come to Jerry's apartment. Jerry and George meet at the drug store where they speak about the coworker whom George slept with after the party. After Jerry picks a medicine, George puts it in his shirt under his jacket as retribution for the short-changing incident before. The security guard witnesses the attempted shoplifting and takes him to jail.

Jerry returns home to find that the prostitute has provided Steve services in advance, and refuses to leave until paid. As Jerry is paying the girl off, cops arrive and he's arrested for solicitation of prostitution. Elaine arrives and prepares to squabble with the prostitute over her fur coat. Later, Jerry and George fondly reminisce about their time in jail.

Production
The episode was originally produced for the second season. However, Larry David, dissatisfied with the episode, had the episode shelved until midway through season three. Its initial broadcast included a special introduction by Jerry to explain the continuity error of George still working in the real estate business.

References

External links 
 

Seinfeld (season 3) episodes
1991 American television episodes
Prostitution in American television
Television episodes written by Larry David
Television episodes written by Jerry Seinfeld